Frédéric Chopin (1810–1849) was a Polish composer and pianist.

Chopin may also refer to:
 Chopin (surname), a list of people with the surname

Places
 Warsaw Chopin Airport, an airport in Poland
 
 Chopin, Louisiana, an unincorporated community in Natchitoches Parish, Louisiana, United States

Ships
 Chopin (ship), a Polish sailing ship
 Fryderyk Chopin (ship), a Polish sailing ship

Other uses
 Chopin (opera), a 1901 opera by Giacomo Orefice, libretto by Angiolo Orvieto
 Chopin: Desire for Love, a 2002 biographical film
 3784 Chopin, an asteroid
 Chopin (crater), a crater on Mercury
 Chopin (vodka), an alcoholic beverage
 Chopin (unit), an obsolete Scottish unit of volume

See also
 Chopin Alveograph, tool for testing flour
 Chopine, a kind of platform shoe worn in 17th-century Spain and Italy